Pseudomonas sRNA P26 is a ncRNA that was predicted using bioinformatic tools in the genome of the opportunistic pathogen Pseudomonas aeruginosa and its expression verified by northern blot analysis.  P26 is conserved across many Gammaproteobacteria species and appears to be consistently located between the DNA directed RNA polymerase (beta subunit) and 50S ribosomal protein L7/L12 genes.

See also

Pseudomonas sRNA P9
Pseudomonas sRNA P11
Pseudomonas sRNA P15
Pseudomonas sRNA P16
Pseudomonas sRNA P24
Pseudomonas sRNA P1

References

External links
 

Non-coding RNA